Betty Blocks BV is a Dutch software-as-a-service provider. It is based in Alkmaar, the Netherlands. Chris Obdam is the chief executive officer of the company.

It is a no-code development platform which helps build mobile and web applications.

History 
The company was founded in 2016 by Chris and Tim Obdam.

In 2017, ING Group invested three million euros in the company. In the same year, it was also included Gartner Quadrant list.

In 2018, the company partnered with VX.

In 2019, NIBC Bank invested an undisclosed amount in the company.

In August 2021, NIBC Bank along with others, invested 33 million euros for further development of its platform.

Software 
The software is an application development platform that works by visual modeling rather than programming and allows non-technical users to build their own web, mobile, or backend applications without writing any code. It simplifies the development of software with simplified steps. Currently, it is further developing to improve the software for citizen developers.

References

External links 
 

Software companies of the Netherlands